Alonso de Tejeda (1540-1628) was a Spanish composer. He succeeded Alonso Lobo as chapelmaster at Toledo Cathedral in 1605.

References

1540 births
1628 deaths
Place of birth missing
Spanish composers
Spanish male composers
People from Toledo, Spain